Kelton Winston (October 22, 1939 – November 30, 1980) was an American football defensive back. He played for the Los Angeles Rams from 1967 to 1968.

References

1939 births
1980 deaths
American football defensive backs
Los Angeles Rams players